Lobenhoffer may refer to:

 Karl Ritter von Lobenhoffer (1843–1901), Bavarian general and Chief of the General Staff of the Bavarian army 
 Wilhelm Lobenhoffer (1879–1945), German surgeon and professor in Bamberg